The Ten Commandments Monument is installed on the New Jerusalem compound, in Dwoi, Jos South, Plateau State, Nigeria. It was erected before 2017 but formally dedicated in 2021, with an altar and an open-air amphitheater with a capacity for 5,000 people. Senator and former governor Jonah Jang funded its construction. Its dedication, attended by the former president of Nigeria Goodluck Jonathan, created tensions within the Plateau State government.

The monument is 25 ft. high and is the largest among existing Ten Commandments Monuments in Africa.

See also

 Ten Commandments Monument (Little Rock, Arkansas)
 Ten Commandments Monument (Oklahoma City)
 Ten Commandments Monument (Austin, Texas)

References

2021 establishments in Nigeria
Monuments and memorials in Nigeria
Outdoor sculptures in Nigeria
Ten Commandments